Per Christian Jersild, better known as P. C. Jersild, (born 1935) is a Swedish author and physician. He also holds an honorary doctorate from the Faculty of Medicine at Uppsala University from 22 January 2000, and another one in engineering from the Royal Institute of Technology (1999).

Biography 

P. C. Jersild was born in Katrineholm in a middle-class family.

His first book was Räknelära which he released 1960 at the age of 25, although he had already been writing for 10 years at that time. Until now he has written 35 books, usually focused on social criticism. His most famous work is Barnens ö (Children's Island), which tells the story of a young boy, on the verge of adulthood, who runs off from a children's summer camp to spend time alone in the big city, Stockholm. Other notable books include Babels hus (The House of Babel), which gives an account of the inhuman treatment of patients at a large modern hospital, said to be modeled on the Karolinska Hospital in Huddinge outside Stockholm, and the science fiction novel En levande själ (A Living Soul), about a living, thinking and feeling human brain floating in a container of liquid.

Aside from his literary production, Jersild has also been a columnist for Dagens Nyheter since the mid-1980s. In 1999, he was elected a member of the Royal Swedish Academy of Sciences.

Awards 
Svenska Dagbladet's Literary Prize 1973 
The Aniara Prize 1974 
The Kellgren Prize 1990 
"Samfundet De Nios stora pris" (Society of the Nine's Grans Prize) 1998
Övralidspriset 2007
Ingemar Hedenius Award 2007

Bibliography
Räknelära, 1960 
Till varmare länder, 1961 
Ledig lördag, 1963 
Resa genom världen, 1965 
Pyton, 1966 
Prins Valiant och Konsum, 1966 
Grisjakten, 1968 
Vi ses i Song My, 1970 
Drömpojken, 1970
Uppror bland marsvinen, 1972 
Stumpen, 1973 
Djurdoktorn, 1973 (The Animal Doctor, trans. Margareta Paul & David M. Paul)
Den elektriska kaninen, 1974 
Barnens ö, 1976  (see also the 1980 film) (Children's Island, trans. Joan Tate)
Babels hus, 1978 (House of Babel, trans. Joan Tate)
En levande själ, 1980 (A Living Soul, trans. Rika Lesser)
Professionella bekännelser, 1981 
Efter floden, 1982 (After the Flood, trans. George Blecher & Lone Thygesen Blecher) 
Lit de parade, 1983 
Den femtionde frälsaren, 1984 
Geniernas återkomst, 1987 
Svarta villan, 1987 
Röda hund, 1988 
Ett ensamt öra, 1989 
Fem hjärtan i en tändsticksask, 1989 
En livsåskådsningsbok, 1990 
Alice och Nisse i lustiga huset, 1991 
Holgerssons, 1991 
Röda hund, 1991 
Hymir, 1993 
En gammal kärlek, 1995 
Ett gammal kylskåp och en förkyld hund, 1995
Sena sagor, 1998
Darwins ofullbordade: Om människans biologiska natur, 1999
Ljusets Drottning, 2000
Hundra Fristående Kolumner i Dagens Nyheter, 2002
Ypsilon, 2012

References

1935 births
Living people
20th-century Swedish novelists
21st-century Swedish novelists
Swedish-language writers
20th-century Swedish physicians
Karolinska Institute alumni
Members of the Royal Swedish Academy of Sciences
Selma Lagerlöf Prize winners
Dobloug Prize winners
Litteris et Artibus recipients
Swedish male novelists